Front Page or The Front Page may also refer to:

Periodicals
 Frontpage (techno magazine), a German magazine for electronic music
 FrontPage Africa, a Liberian daily newspaper
 FrontPage Magazine, an online political magazine sometimes known as The Front Page
 Frontpage: Ulat ni Mel Tiangco, a Philippine news bulletin
 The Michigan FrontPage, a weekly newspaper in Detroit, Michigan

Television and movies
 Front Page (newsmagazine), a short-lived TV show in 1993
 Frontpage (TV series), a 2008 Malaysian drama series
 Front Page (film), a 1990 Hong Kong film starring Michael Hui
 The Front Page (1931 film), starring Adolphe Menjou and Pat O'Brien
 The Front Page (1974 film), directed by Billy Wilder, starring Jack Lemmon and Walter Matthau
 The Front Page (TV series), an American series that aired in 1949
 "The Front Page" (Diff'rent Strokes), the final episode of the sitcom Diff'rent Strokes

Other
 Front Page Challenge, a Canadian television game show that aired from 1957 to 1995
 Front Page (New Zealand company), a news and political media company
 The Front Page, a 1928 Broadway comedy written by Ben Hecht and Charles MacArthur
 Front Page, a 2003 jazz album by Biréli Lagrène, Dominique Di Piazza, and Dennis Chambers
 Microsoft FrontPage, discontinued software by Microsoft
 Reddit, describes itself as the front page of the Internet.

See also
 Home page (disambiguation)